"Puppet Man" is a song written by Neil Sedaka and Howard Greenfield. It was originally recorded by Sedaka on his 1969 Workin' on a Groovy Thing LP.  The first hit version was by The Fifth Dimension in 1970. The following year it was also a hit for Tom Jones.

The Fifth Dimension's original of "Puppet Man" reached #24 on the U.S. Billboard Hot 100 in the spring of 1970.

Charts

Tom Jones version

Tom Jones' version was released the following spring. It reached No. 26 on the U.S. Billboard Hot 100, spending 10 weeks on the chart.  For the first six weeks the single was backed with "Every Mile," then was changed to "Resurrection Shuffle", which also became a U.S. top 40 hit, reaching No. 38 and keeping the record on the charts an additional five weeks.

Charts

References

External links
 
 

 
 

1969 songs
1970 singles
1971 singles
Neil Sedaka songs
The 5th Dimension songs
Tom Jones (singer) songs
Songs written by Neil Sedaka
Songs with lyrics by Howard Greenfield
Bell Records singles
Parrot Records singles